Michael Sinclair Bellamy II (born June 28, 1966) is a former American football wide receiver who played in the National Football League (NFL) for the Philadelphia Eagles from 1990] to 1991. He is currently the running backs coach for the Illinois Fighting Illini football team. Spending time with the Indianapolis Colts, Chicago Bears and the Oakland Raiders. Bellamy completed his career with the Frankfurt Galaxy of the World Football League (WFL). He was taken by the Eagles in the second round of the 1990 NFL Draft. He played college football at Illinois.

College career

College of DuPage
In 1987, Mike Bellamy was a Junior College All-American for College of DuPage The top rated Junior College Wide Receiver prospect of 1987, Bellamy choose to attend University of Illinois. In 2009, Mike Bellamy was inducted into the NJCAA Football Hall of Fame in 2007, for his achievements over his Junior College career

University of Illinois
In 1989, Bellamy caught 59 passes for 927 yards and eight touchdowns for the Illinois Fighting Illini. He earned second-team All-America honors as a kick returner and first-team All-Big Ten honors as a wide receiver after the season. Being part of the 1989-1990 Fighting Illini, Bellamy and his teammates defeated the Virginia Cavaliers in the 1990 Florida Citrus Bowl. Bellamy recorded 10 catches for 189 yards for the game, leading the Illini to victory with teammate Jeff George.

Professional career
Bellamy was selected by the Philadelphia Eagles in the second round (51st overall) of the 1990 NFL Draft. He played in only six games for the Eagles because of injury, catching no passes. He returned a punt and two kickoffs as the Eagles reached the playoffs. He was released on August 26, 1991.

Bellamy spent time on offseason rosters for the Indianapolis Colts, Chicago Bears, and Oakland Raiders from 1992 to 1995. Being invited to participate in the resurgent World Football League, Bellamy finished his career playing in back to back World Bowl Championships, winning in 1996. In 1996, Bellamy also led the World League in touchdown receptions, along with teammates Mario Bailey and Bobby Olive.

Coaching career
Bellamy spent four seasons on the Illinois staff (2012–15), including three as an assistant coach. He was promoted to wide receivers coach in February 2013 after serving one year as assistant director of player personnel and relations (2012).

References

External links
 Toledo profile

1966 births
Living people
American football wide receivers
Clark Atlanta Panthers football coaches
Frankfurt Galaxy players
Illinois Fighting Illini football coaches
Illinois Fighting Illini football players
Mississippi State Bulldogs football coaches
Philadelphia Eagles players
Toledo Rockets football coaches
High school football coaches in Georgia (U.S. state)
Coaches of American football from Illinois
Players of American football from Chicago
Players of American football from New York City